Alessandro Spanò (born 19 June 1994) is a former professional footballer who played as a defender. He spent most of his career with Reggiana, helping them gain promotion to the Serie B in 2020 as their captain.

Club career
Spanò made his professional debut with Pro Patria in a 1–0 Serie C defeat to Pro Vercelli on 8 September 2013.

He moved to Reggiana and played with them in the Serie D and Serie C, eventually becoming their captain. On 22 July 2020, Spanò led Reggiana as they beat Bari 1–0 and earned promotion to the Serie B for the first time in 21 years. One week later, Spanò announced he was retiring from football to further his education after graduating with a degree in economics, and earning an international scholarship.

References

External links

 

1994 births
Living people
People from Giussano
Italian footballers
Association football defenders
Aurora Pro Patria 1919 players
A.C. Reggiana 1919 players
Serie C players
Serie D players
Footballers from Lombardy
Sportspeople from the Province of Monza e Brianza